Grzegorz Józef Tobiszowski (born 1 November 1965 in Ruda Śląska) is a Polish politician. He was elected to the Sejm on 25 September 2005, getting 7662 votes in 31 Katowice district as a candidate from the Law and Justice list.

Tobiszowski was one of the few politicians in Europe who praised the United States withdrawal from the Paris Agreement in 2017.

See also
Members of Polish Sejm 2005-2007

References

External links
Grzegorz Tobiszowski - parliamentary page - includes declarations of interest, voting record, and transcripts of speeches.

1965 births
Living people
People from Ruda Śląska
Members of the Polish Sejm 2005–2007
Law and Justice politicians
Members of the Polish Sejm 2007–2011
Members of the Polish Sejm 2011–2015
MEPs for Poland 2019–2024